Louise Bogan (August 11, 1897 – February 4, 1970) was an American poet.  She was appointed the fourth Poet Laureate to the Library of Congress in 1945, and was the first woman to hold this title. Throughout her life she wrote poetry, fiction, and criticism, and became the regular poetry reviewer for The New Yorker.

Dictionary of Literary Biography contributor Brett C. Millier described her as "one of the finest lyric poets America has produced." He said, "the fact that she was a woman and that she defended formal, lyric poetry in an age of expansive experimentation made evaluation of her work, until quite recently, somewhat condescending."

Early life
Bogan was born in Livermore Falls, Maine. With the help of a female benefactor, Bogan attended Girls' Latin School for five years, where she began writing poetry and reading the first issues of Poetry: A Magazine of Verse. Her education eventually gave her the opportunity to attend Boston University. In 1916 she left the university after completing her freshman year.

Bogan moved to New York to pursue a career in writing, and her only daughter, Maidie Alexander, was left in the care of Bogan's parents. In 1920 she left and spent a few years in Vienna, where she explored her loneliness and her new identity in verse. She returned to New York City and published her first book of poetry, Body of This Death: Poems. Four years later, she published her second book of poetry, Dark Summer: Poems, and shortly after was hired as a poetry editor for The New Yorker. It was during this time frame that Bogan came to be in contact with influential writers of the time like William Carlos Williams, Edmund Wilson, Marianne Moore, John Reed, Lola Ridge, and Malcolm Cowley.

Career
Bogan is the author of six poetry collections, including Body of This Death (1923), Collected Poems: 1923–1953 (1954), and The Blue Estuaries: Poems, 1923–1968 (1968). She is also the author of several books of prose and translations. Bogan's awards include two fellowships from the Guggenheim Foundation, the 1955 Bollingen Prize from Yale University, and monetary awards from the Academy of American Poets and the National Endowment for the Arts. In 1945, she was appointed the Consultant in Poetry to the Library of Congress.

Not only was it difficult being a female poet in the 1930s and 1940s, but her lower-middle-class Irish background and limited education also brought on much ambivalence and contradiction for Louise Bogan. She even refused to review women poets in her early career and stated, "I have found from bitter experience that one woman poet is at a disadvantage in reviewing another, if the review be not laudatory."

Bogan published her first volume of poems, Body of This Death, in 1923.  Her second volume, Dark Summer, appeared six years later in 1929.  She also translated works by Ernst Jünger, Goethe, and Jules Renard.  Later in Bogan's life, a volume of her collected works, The Blue Estuaries: Poems 1923–1968, was published with such poems as "The Dream" and "Women."

Her poetry was published in The New Republic, The Nation, Poetry: A Magazine of Verse, Scribner's, and Atlantic Monthly. Her Collected Poems: 1923–1953 won her the Bollingen award in 1955 as well as an award from the Academy of American Poets in 1959. She was the poetry reviewer of The New Yorker from 1931 until she retired in 1970, shortly before her death, stating: "No more pronouncements on lousy verse. No more hidden competition. No more struggling not to be a square."

She was a strong supporter, as well as a friend, of the poet Theodore Roethke. In a letter to Edmund Wilson, she detailed a raucous affair that she and the yet-unpublished Roethke carried on in 1935, during the time between his expulsion from Lafayette College and his return to Michigan. At the time she seemed little impressed by what she called his "very, very small lyrics"; she seems to have viewed the affair as, at most, a possible source for her own work (see What the Woman Lived: Collected letters of Louise Bogan).

A number of autobiographical pieces were published posthumously in Journey around My Room (1980). Elizabeth Frank's biography of Louise Bogan, Louise Bogan: A Portrait, won a Pulitzer Prize in 1986. Ruth Anderson's sound poem I Come Out of Your Sleep (revised and recorded on Sinopah 1997 XI) is constructed from speech sounds in Bogan's poem "Little Lobelia."
"I cannot believe that the inscrutable universe turns on an axis of suffering; surely the strange beauty of the world must somewhere rest on pure joy!" – Louise BoganThough open to interpretation, "Medusa" is a poem that revolves around the petrification of the speaker who contemplates the concept of time. In the poem, after the speaker bears witness to the apparition of the Gorgon Medusa, the speaker ponders on how nature and life will continue, as "the water will always fall, and will not fall" and "the grass will always be growing for hay" while "I shall stand here like a shadow" and "nothing will ever stir". While many interpretations of the poem exist, one possible explanation for the bleakness of this poem may revolve around Bogan's depression and solitude after divorcing from her first husband and living in poverty with a daughter in hand. The idea that one would become petrified and lost in time by Medusa is similar to a feeling of loss and despair as one feels helpless and stuck in a situation where one feels their situation is unchangeable. Brett C. Millier, a Professor of Literature at Middlebury College, describes Bogan's poetry as one where "Betrayal, particularly sexual betrayal, is a constant theme." At a time where she most likely felt betrayed by her husband and society, Bogan feels like the speaker in "Medusa", stuck in a dead scene where her eyes could no longer drift away to a better life.

References

External links
Modern American Poetry: Louise Bogan (1897–1970)
Biography at poets.org
"The Dream – Poem by Louise Bogan"
Louise Bogan Quotes
Modernism in American Literature
The Necessity of Form to the Poetry of Louise Bogan
Louise Bogan in her Prose
 Louise Bogan Papers from the Amherst College Archives & Special Collections
 The Louise Bogan Papers at Washington University in St. Louis
 Modern American Poetry, critical essays on Bogan's works
 Academy of American Poets
 
 
Louise Bogan and J.V. Cunningham reading and discussing their poems
Poetry Archive-Louise Bogan

1897 births
1970 deaths
Boston University alumni
People from Livermore Falls, Maine
Formalist poets
American women poets
Bollingen Prize recipients
Poets from Maine
20th-century American poets
20th-century American women writers
American Poets Laureate
Translators of Johann Wolfgang von Goethe
Members of the American Academy of Arts and Letters